Helenium drummondii is a species of perennial plant in the Sunflower Family, commonly known as fringed sneezeweed. It is native to the south- central United States, in eastern Texas, Arkansas, and Louisiana.

Helenium drummondii is an perennial herb up to 60 cm (2 feet) tall. Leaves are long, thin, and grass-like. One plant can usually produce only 1-3 flower heads. The head is spherical or hemispherical, with sometimes as many as 1000 yellow disc florets, plus 13-30 yellow ray florets. The species grows in bogs, swamps, and other wet places.

References

External links
Photo of herbarium specimen at Missouri Botanical Garden, collected in Texas in 1872, isotype of Helenium drummondii

Flora of the Southern United States
Plants described in 1903
drummondii